Syneta betulae is a species of beetle from the family of leaf beetles, subfamily Synetinae.

Subspecies
There are two subspecies of S. betulae:
 Syneta betulae amurensis Pic, 1901
 Syneta betulae betulae (Fabricius, 1792)

Distribution
Syneta betulae is distributed in the Fennoscandia and Siberia, as well as in Japan and China.

Description
The body is elongated, pubescent, and brown. The legs and antenna are red coloured. The males are darker than the females, often completely dark brown. The pronotum is narrower than the elytra and is laterally marginal, with 3-4 sharp teeth and thickened anterior angles.

Environment
Syneta betulae feeds on various deciduous trees, mainly birch leaves. The larva feeds on roots in soil.

References

Synetinae
Beetles described in 1792
Taxa named by Johan Christian Fabricius